Skolkovo is the name of several rural localities in Russia:
Skolkovo, Moscow Oblast, a village in Odintsovsky District, Moscow Oblast, 
Skolkovo, Filinsky Selsoviet, Vachsky District, Nizhny Novgorod Oblast, a village in Filinsky Selsoviet of Vachsky District of Nizhny Novgorod Oblast, 
Skolkovo, Kazakovsky Selsoviet, Vachsky District, Nizhny Novgorod Oblast, a village in Kazakovsky Selsoviet of Vachsky District of Nizhny Novgorod Oblast, 
Skolkovo, Samara Oblast, a selo in Kinelsky District of Samara Oblast,